Adejeania is a genus of tachinid flies from the Americas. While most species are found in South America, A. vexatrix occurs from Mexico up to British Columbia. The genus name is an alteration of Dejeania, meaning "not Dejeania". Other tachinid genera from the same root are Eudejeania, Paradejeania and Protodejeania.

Species
This is a list of species according to Zipcode Zoo, with additional information from The Diptera Site.

Adejeania analis (Macquart, 1843) (Colombia)
Adejeania andina (Townsend, 1912) (Peru)
Adejeania anduzei Curran, 1947	(Venezuela)
Adejeania armata (Wiedemann, 1830) (Cuba)
Adejeania aurea (Giglio-Tos, 1893) (Mexico)
Adejeania bicaudata Curran, 1947 (Brazil)
Adejeania biornata Curran, 1947 (Brazil)
Adejeania brasiliensis (Robineau-Desvoidy, 1830) (Brazil)
Adejeania brevihirta Curran, 1947 (Venezuela)
Adejeania brevirostris Curran, 1947 (Mexico)
Adejeania browni Curran, 1947  (Ecuador, Colombia)
Adejeania conclusa Curran, 1947 (Brazil)
Adejeania corpulenta (Wiedemann, 1830) (Mexico)
Adejeania grandis Guimaraes, 1966 (Brazil)
Adejeania honesta (Rondani, 1851) (Ecuador)
Adejeania lopesi Guimaraes, 1966 (Brazil)
Adejeania magalhaesi Guimaraes, 1966 (Brazil)
Adejeania marginalis Curran, 1947(Brazil)
Adejeania nigrothoracica (Vimmer & Soukup, 1940) (Peru)
Adejeania palpalis Curran, 1947(Panama)
Adejeania pellucens Guimaraes, 1966 (Brazil)
Adejeania rubropilosa Guimaraes, 1973
Adejeania rufipalpis (Macquart, 1843) (Mexico)
Adejeania sabroskyi Guimaraes, 1966 (Brazil)
Adejeania saetigera Guimaraes, 1966 (Brazil)
Adejeania santipauli Guimaraes, 1966 (Brazil)
Adejeania spiniventris Guimaraes, 1966 (Brazil)
Adejeania spinosa Guimaraes, 1966 (Brazil)
Adejeania thompsoni Guimaraes, 1966 (Brazil)
Adejeania townsendi Curran, 1947 (Brazil)
Adejeania tridens Curran, 1947 (Brazil)
Adejeania uniformis Curran, 1947 (Brazil)
Adejeania verrugana (Townsend, 1914) (Peru)
Adejeania vexatrix (Osten Sacken, 1877) (North America)
Adejeania wygodzinskyi Guimaraes, 1966 (Brazil)
Adejeania xanthopilosa Guimaraes, 1966 (Brazil)
Adejeania ypsilon Curran, 1947 (Brazil)

References

Further reading
 Wiedemann, C. R. W. (1830). Aussereuropäische zweiflügelige Insekten. Zweiter Theil. Schulz, Hamm.
 Robineau-Desvoidy, J. B. (1830). Essai sur les myodaires. Mem. Pres. Div. Sav. Acad. Sci. Inst. Fr. 2(2).

 
Diptera of North America
Diptera of South America
Tachinidae genera
Taxa named by Charles Henry Tyler Townsend